Ytraberget is a small peninsula that sticks out into the Hafrsfjord in the municipality of Sola in Rogaland county, Norway. Ytraberget is connected to Indraberget and it is located, just north of the village of Sørnes, between two small bays: Sørnesvågen and Grannesvågen. 

Harald Fairhair (ca. 865-ca. 933) fought the Battle of Hafrsfjord during 872 AD. In the Saga by Snorri Sturluson, a little isle is mentioned as the location where Kjotve the Rich fled the battle. It is thought that the earth's crust rebounding post glaciation over 1,100 years has exposed the connection between the two. 

This is the area of the Bronze Age stone fortifications. Near the top of Ytraberget there is a stone slab monument erected in 1972 near the ruins for the 1,100-year anniversary of the Battle of Hafrsfjord. There are good fishing and swimming possibilities at Ytraberget. Ytraberget today is a very common swimming spot for local teenagers.

Indraberget is the mainland area that Ytreberget connects to. This area has some of the richest limestone flora in this part of Norway.  There is also rich archeological findings for the Stone Age, Bronze Age and to modern times.

References

External links
 Arkeologisk Museum i Stavanger om Ytraberget  
 Local History  
 The Stavanger Region - Ytraberget by Hafrsfjord  

Jæren
Sola, Norway
Landforms of Rogaland